Maulvi Nazir (also Maulvi Nazir Wazir; 1975 – ) was a leading militant of the Pakistani Taliban in South Waziristan. Nazir's operations were based in Wana.

He was opposed to foreigners exercising influence in Waziristan, including Americans and Uzbek jihadists. He was killed by a U.S. drone strike on 2 January 2013. The drone strike also killed his deputy Ratta Khan, and two commanders named Kochai and Chewantee.

Background
According to The Jamestown Foundation, Nazir was a member of the Kakakhel tribe, part of the Ahmedzai Waziris. With an estimated birth year of 1975, he was a dual citizen of both Afghanistan and Pakistan and until 2010 owned property in Kandahar. He controlled large portions of South Waziristan and maintained influence in southwestern Afghan provinces of Paktika, Zabul, Helmand and into Kandahar.

Early activities
Prior to the creation of the Taliban he was affiliated with the Hezbe Islami Gulbuddin, an older conservative group supported by Pakistan's Inter-service Intelligence Directorate during the Soviet occupation of Afghanistan. He later joined the Taliban and aligned himself politically with Maulana Fazlur Rahman's JUI party.

With the notable approval of Mullah Dadullah and Siraj Haqqani, Nazir enforced sharia in South Waziristan in 2006 with instructions to his supporters to avoid combating the Pakistani army.

Conflicts with Uzbek militants
After Maulvi Nazir established sharia his forces, with the support of the Pakistani military, engaged in battle with Uzbek militants of the Islamic Movement of Uzbekistan (IMU) operating in the region under Tahir Yuldashev. Although more than 250 Uzbeks were killed in the fighting and others were forced to flee, Nazir stated in a 2011 interview that he and the IMU had reconciled after Yuldashev's death in 2009.

Unification against NATO troops
In early 2009 Nazir and two rival warlords, Baitullah Mehsud and Hafiz Gul Bahadur, agreed to put aside differences to unify efforts against NATO troops under the newly formed Shura Ittehad-ul-Mujahideen, the Council of United Mujahedeen. In a written statement circulated in a one-page Urdu-language pamphlet, the three affirmed that they would put aside differences to fight American-led forces. The statement included a declaration of allegiance to both Mullah Omar and Osama bin Laden.

Rifts within the ranks
After the death of the Tehrik-e-Taliban Pakistan (TTP) leader Baitullah Mehsud, who was killed by a CIA drone on 5 August 2009, reports surfaced of infighting within the TTP. Mehsud was the leader of the loosely-knit Pakistani Taliban, a militant network comprising 13 different, and sometimes rival, factions. His death created a power vacuum that led to a power struggle within the TTP.

On 16 August 2009, an alleged group of fighters loyal to Baitullah Mehsud, armed with small arms and rocket-propelled grenades (RPGs), attacked a group of Nazir's men, killing at least 17 militants.  According to Nazir's spokesman Shaheen Wazir, the attack was so sudden, that Nazir's fighters couldn't even fire back. It was also reported that Nazir himself was one of the 17 men killed. Baitullah Mehsud's camp denied the accusations. Abdul Haq, another spokesman for Nazir said he didn't know whether Mehsud's loyalists or the Pakistan Army were behind the attack.

Efforts against Nazir
In October 2011, Nazir's brother Hazrat Umar was killed along with several other militants in a US drone strike in South Waziristan. Local residents confirmed Hazrat Umar's death.

Death
A U.S. drone strike killed Maulvi Nazir on 2 January 2013 in Angoor Adda, near the capital of Wana, South Waziristan. Bahawal Khan, also known as Salahuddin Ayubi, was announced as Nazir's successor.

References

Taliban leaders
1975 births
2013 deaths
Tehrik-i-Taliban Pakistan members
Pashtun people
Pakistani people of Afghan descent
Afghan people of Pakistani descent
Deaths by United States drone strikes in Pakistan